Taso Nicholas Stavrakis (born July 12, 1957) is an American film and television actor and stunt performer best known for his appearances in the George A. Romero films Dawn of the Dead, Knightriders, and Day of the Dead.

Career

TV and Film
Recruited by his good friend and Carnegie-Mellon University classmate Tom Savini, Stavrakis assisted with stunts and special makeup effects on several seminal 1980s horror productions, including the original Friday the 13th, in which he portrayed "The Prowler" (as the unidentified killer was initially referred to in Victor Miller's screenplay). Romero frequently joked that Stavrakis should be included in the Guinness Book of World Records for having appeared as the most zombies in his Dead series (5 in Dawn and 6 in Day).

Offered the opportunity to portray villain Jason Voorhees in Friday the 13th Part 2, Stavrakis turned down the role as his friend Savini had declined to create the film's makeup effects. He instead took an opportunity to create special makeup effects for He Knows You're Alone, an early thriller by Armand Mastroianni (and incidentally Tom Hanks's first feature film), with whom Stavrakis would work again on the 2006 cinematic adaptation of The Celestine Prophecy

Stavrakis eventually gravitated almost exclusively toward stunt work, serving as stunt coordinator on Day of the Dead and the Romero-scripted Creepshow 2 (1987), while his acting work during this period included a brief stint on As the World Turns as Stavros, a Greek interpreter.

His more recent film work includes appearances in Martin Campbell's The Mask of Zorro, Gore Verbinski's Pirates of the Caribbean: The Curse of the Black Pearl (in a "Tortuga Island" sequence which was edited from the first film but utilized in the sequel) and Michael Mann's 2006 Miami Vice redux, as well as wrangling duties on pictures such as Jackass Number Two and the Seth Green road-trip comedy Sex Drive.

In 2010, Stavrakis appeared as a featured zombie in the pilot episode of the AMC Network series The Walking Dead. As the "living dead" subgenre has increased in popularity over the years, Taso now makes occasional appearances at horror-themed conventions around the world. In 2018, his brother Christian sculpted and installed a bronze bust of George Romero in the Monroeville Mall, the first public monument to Romero's work and career.

Jousting and stage

A tournament fencer and seasoned equestrian, Stavrakis is a founding member of the Hanlon-Lees Action Theater, an American entertainment company which pioneered the art of theatrical jousting. He also performed for several years with the Big Apple Circus during the mid-1990s as a variety of characters (including "Captain Coney," a Coney Island-inspired superhero), and remains a member of BAC's Clown Care unit, providing entertainment and encouragement to children in hospital.

West Virginia Renaissance Festival

In 2018 Taso fulfilled a lifelong dream by founding the West Virginia Renaissance Festival, the first and only medieval faire in that state. Located in Lewisburg, WV, the festival currently runs for four weekends every June.

Selected filmography
 Dawn of the Dead (1978)
 Friday the 13th (1980)
 He Knows You're Alone (1980)
 Knightriders (1981)
 Day of the Dead (1985)
 Creepshow 2 (1987)
 As the World Turns (1987)
 Bloodsucking Pharaohs in Pittsburgh (1991)
 The Mask of Zorro (1998)
 Pirates of the Caribbean: The Curse of the Black Pearl (2003)
 Dawn of the Dead (2004)
 Miami Vice (2006)
 The Celestine Prophecy (2006)
 The Control Group (2017)

References

External links
 
 Interview with Taso on a Friday the 13th fansite
 Bio page on Hanlon-Lees Action Theater website

1957 births
Male actors from Pittsburgh
American people of Greek descent
American male film actors
American stunt performers
Living people
Special effects people